Uma Chowdhry is an American chemist whose career has been spent in research and management positions with E. I. du Pont de Nemours and Company.
She has specialized in the science of ceramic materials, including catalysts, proton conductors, superconductors and ceramic packaging for microelectronics.

Early life and education
Chowdhry was born in Mumbai, India in 1947. She received a Bachelor's degree in physics from the University of Bombay (now Mumbai University) in 1968 before coming to the United States.   She received a Master of Science degree from the California Institute of Technology (Caltech) in engineering science in 1970.  After two years with Ford Motor Company, she entered the Massachusetts Institute of Technology (MIT) where she earned a Ph.D. in materials science in 1976.

Career

DuPont
She joined DuPont in 1977 as a research scientist 
in Central Research & Development Department of E. I. du Pont de Nemours and Company at the DuPont Experimental Station in Wilmington, Delaware. By 1985 she had been promoted to Research Manager of Central Research. In 1987 she led DuPont's research effort in ceramic superconducting materials and developed a program that generated over 20 patents and 50 publications.  In 1988 she became Laboratory Director of the Electronics group, and by 1991 was promoted to be its Director.

The following year she was appointed Laboratory Director of the Jackson Laboratory for the Specialty Chemicals group. In 1993 she became R&D Director, Specialty Chemicals. In 1995 she became Business Director for Terathane Products, and 2 year later was promoted to Business Planning and Technology Director for Chemicals. In 1999 she was promoted to Director of DuPont Engineering Technology.

In 2006 she became Senior Vice President and Global Chief Science and Technology Officer of DuPont, responsible for the company's core research programs and the DuPont "APEX" portfolio of research programs including basic chemistry, materials science and biotechnology. She retired in September 2010, becoming Chief Science & Technology Officer Emeritus.

In response to contamination of Ohio river caused by perfluorooctanoic acid (PFOA, also known as C8), the key ingredient in Teflon, and subsequent cases of cancer and other medical issues, when asked if this C8 chemical could be responsible for babies born with deformities in 2 out of 8 former DuPont women employees, Ms. Uma responded "In the realm of scientific facts, this is not considered a statistically significant sample."

Other contributions
Chowdhry has served on study groups for the National Research Council to assess various technology topics of national interest, and was a member of National Research Council's Committee on Globalization (2004). Chowdhry is a member of the National Committee on Women in Science and Engineering sponsored by both the National Academy of Sciences and the National Academy of Engineering since 1999. 

She has served on the board of directors for the Industrial Research Institute (2002-2005), Baxter International Inc. (2012-), 
LORD Corporation (2010-), 
the Advisory Board for Advanced Technology at the National Institute of Standards (NIST, 2010),
the National Inventors Hall of Fame and the Laboratory Operations Board for the Department of Energy for the US Government. She was appointed to the Laboratory Operations Board for the U.S. Department of Energy, Washington, D.C. in 2002.

Chowdhry has served on advisory boards of engineering schools at MIT, University of Pennsylvania, Princeton University and the University of Delaware.

Uma Chowdhry and her husband, Vinay Chowdhry, live in Wilmington, Delaware. She was elected to the board of trustees for Christiana Care Health Services in Delaware in 2003.

Awards and honors
For her contributions to the science of ceramics, Chowdhry was elected Fellow of the American Ceramic Society in 1989, where she chaired the Academy's Emerging Technologies Committee, 2002–2004.

She was elected a member to the National Academy of Engineering in 1996 for the application of advanced ceramic technologies to novel catalyst structures, large-scale chemical synthesis, and multilayer electronic circuit manufacture. Besides her membership, she has served on the program advisory board and election subcommittees.  She was also elected to the American Academy of Arts and Sciences in 2003.

Chowdhry received the 2011 IRI Medal for her leadership contributions at DuPont. Chowdhry received the 2011 Earle B. Barnes Award for Leadership in Chemical Research Management from the American Chemical Society.

References

External links

1947 births
Living people
20th-century American chemists
20th-century American women scientists
American people of Indian descent
DuPont people
Scientists from Mumbai
Members of the United States National Academy of Engineering
Women chief technology officers
American chief technology officers
Indian Institute of Science alumni
21st-century American chemists
21st-century American women scientists
California Institute of Technology alumni
MIT School of Engineering alumni
Scientists from Delaware
Fellows of the American Ceramic Society